A lease is a type of contractual arrangement.

Lease may also refer to:

People with the name 
 Alva Lease Duckwall (1877–1937), American businessman
 Mary Elizabeth Lease (1850–1933), American writer and activist
 Rex Lease (1903–1966), American actor

Other uses
 Lease (computer science)
 Lease Corporation International
 Lease Islands, a group of islands in Indonesia

See also 
 Leaser Lake
 Leasing Foundation